Elections to the Uttar Pradesh Legislative Assembly were held in 2002. Following a spell of 56 days of President’s Rule from 3 March to 2 May 2002, Mayawati became Chief Minister on 3 May 2002 for the third time after the BJP extended support to the BSP. BJP state president Kalraj Mishra resigned, and was replaced by Vinay Katiyar, who thought up slogans like "Haathi nahin Ganesh hai, Brahma Vishnu Mahesh hai" to defend the alliance. But the problems kept mounting, and Mayawati resigned in August 2003.

On 29 August 2003, Mulayam Singh Yadav was sworn in as the Chief Minister with the support of BSP dissidents and ran the government until 2007. It is said that BJP leaders convinced Vajpayee that Yadav would help in the 2004 Lok Sabha elections — Mulayam did not, however, help, and while the NDA lost power at the Centre. Some BJP leaders continue to believe that Mulayam would have been marginalized had he not been helped in 2003.

Results

Elected members

References

2002
Uttar Pradesh
2000s in Uttar Pradesh